Margaret E. Snyder (February 25, 1940 - December 15, 2010) was an American politician from California and a member of the Democratic Party.  A former legal secretary and community volunteer, she served on the Modesto School Board from 1985 until 1992, when she won election to the newly created 25th district in the California State Assembly.

She entered the legislature with a relatively liberal record from her years on the school board.  She quickly cultivated her conservative Central Valley district, however, as exemplified by her 100 percent rating from the NRA.   Nevertheless, Snyder was unable to win reelection in 1994, when Republicans enjoyed huge wins across the country.  She lost to Republican George House, a retired CHP commander and almond farmer, who at the time was considered a weak candidate.

Electoral history

References

External links
Join California

School board members in California
Members of the California State Assembly
Women state legislators in California
1940 births
2010 deaths